Gustav Lærum (2 June 1870, in Fet – 21 May 1938) was a Norwegian satirical illustrator, caricaturist and sculptor.

He provided illustrations for the satirical magazines Korsaren, Tyrihans, and Vikingen, and also the newspaper Verdens Gang. Selected illustrations were published in Fra Uret til Grand, Norske Politici (1895), and Skyggebilder (1912). His sculptures include statues or busts of Prime Ministers Johan Sverdrup, Jørgen Løvland, and Gunnar Knudsen.

References

1870 births
1938 deaths
People from Fet
Norwegian illustrators
Norwegian caricaturists
Norwegian editorial cartoonists
Norwegian sculptors
20th-century sculptors